The 1863 California gubernatorial election was held on September 2, 1863, to elect the governor of California. Former governor John G. Downey was unsuccessful in his bid for reelection to a second, non-consecutive term, losing to former United States Representative Frederick Low.

Results

References

1863
California
gubernatorial
September 1863 events